Randolph High School may refer to;
Randolph High School (Massachusetts), Randolph, Massachusetts 
Randolph High School (Nebraska), Randolph, Nebraska
Randolph High School (New Jersey), Randolph, New Jersey 
Randolph High School (New York), Randolph, New York
Randolph High School (Texas), Universal City, Texas
Randolph High School (Wisconsin), Randolph, Wisconsin

See also

Alabama
Randolph School, Huntsville, Alabama
Randolph County High School, public middle and high school in Wedowee, Alabama

North Carolina
Eastern Randolph High School, Ramseur, North Carolina
Southwestern Randolph High School, Asheboro, North Carolina

Other

Randolph Secondary School, Randolph, Minnesota
The Randolph School, Wappingers Falls, New York